Dawn-Euphemia is a township in southwestern Ontario, Canada, in Lambton County. Residents primarily are employed by the agricultural industry, or by local industries such as Union Gas distribution centre, along with various smaller agricultural manufacturers or service providers. The township municipal office is located in Rutherford.

Major transportation routes include Cairo Road and Oil Heritage Road directed north–south, and Bentpath Line and Lambton Line running east–west. One elementary school serves the area, Dawn-Euphemia School. Students attend secondary school in nearby Petrolia and Dresden, both of which serve as local service centres for residents.

Communities
The township comprises the communities of Aberfeldy, Aughrim, Beaver Meadow, Bentpath, Cairo, Cuthbert, Dawn, Dawn Valley, Edys Mills, Florence, Garville, Huffs Corners, Langbank, Oakdale, Rutherford and Shetland.

History
The Western Ontario Pacific Railway was constructed through the southeastern corner of the township in 1890. The Western Ontario Pacific was an arm's length subsidiary of the Canadian Pacific Railway, which sought to connect its railway empire directly to Windsor and Detroit, rather than through the American-owned Canada Southern Railway at St. Thomas.

Demographics 

See also
List of townships in Ontario

References

External links

Township municipalities in Ontario
Lower-tier municipalities in Ontario
Municipalities in Lambton County